Northorpe North Road railway station served the town of Northorpe, West Riding of Yorkshire, England, from 1891 to 1965 on the Spen Valley Line.

History 
The station was opened as Northorpe on 1 December 1891 by the Lancashire and Yorkshire Railway. It was closed temporarily on 2 April 1917 but it reopened on 5 May 1919. Its name was changed to Northorpe North Road on 2 June 1924. The station closed permanently on 14 June 1965.

References

External links 

Disused railway stations in West Yorkshire
Former Lancashire and Yorkshire Railway stations
Railway stations in Great Britain opened in 1891
Railway stations in Great Britain closed in 1917
Railway stations in Great Britain opened in 1919
Railway stations in Great Britain closed in 1965
1891 establishments in England
1965 disestablishments in England
Beeching closures in England